The Unix Desktop Environment (UDE) is a desktop environment for the X Window System. Given its efficient and lightweight design it can be used on almost any Unix-like operating system, mostly without any porting effort.

User interface

UDE's user interface philosophy is quite different from that of other desktop environments. It is designed to be used very efficiently after a short learning phase. There is no taskbar or desktop panel or equivalent. Windows lack a title bar and as such there are no buttons to close, resize, iconify or maximize windows on the window borders. These buttons are replaced by the so-called hex menu or honeycomb that appears when the user clicks on the window border (See picture).

User interaction works entirely by using the different mouse buttons on window borders and the desktop background. Combinations of mouse clicks can trigger more complex actions such as moving a window from one workspace to another or loading multiple programs (or multiple instances of a single program) at a time. For that reason, efficient usage of UDE is only possible using a three-button mouse. As of today, UDE offers only very basic support for keyboard shortcuts.

The window manager is uwm (unrelated to the older uwm from 1985 or previous).

External links

Official website
http://www.agutscher.de/udepatch.html
http://www.agutscher.de/udethemes.html

Free desktop environments

de:UWM (Computer)#UDE_Window_Manager